Christen Heiberg may refer to:

 Christen Heiberg (civil servant) (1737–1801), Norwegian civil servant
 Christen Heiberg (physician) (1799–1872), Norwegian surgeon